Russula ochroleuca is a member of the genus Russula. A group that have become known as brittlegills. It has been commonly known as the common yellow russula for some years, and latterly the ochre brittlegill. It is widespread, and common in mixed woodland.

Taxonomy
Russula ochroleuca was first noted and named as a species of Agaricus by the pioneering South African mycologist Christian Hendrik Persoon in 1801.

Description
The cap margin becomes furrowed when mature, and it is two-thirds peeling. The gills are white to greyish white, and are adnexed. The taste is mild to moderately hot.

It could be confused with the similar-looking and much better tasting Russula claroflava.

Distribution and habitat
Russula ochroleuca grows in deciduous and coniferous forest, where it (at least in Northwestern Europe) is very common. In the USA it is fairly common under conifers; birch, and aspen in the Northern States.

Edibility
Although considered edible, it is not known as particularly tasty. It is mild to moderately hot.

See also
 List of Russula species

References

 "Danske storsvampe. Basidiesvampe" [a key to Danish basidiomycetes] J.H. Petersen and J. Vesterholt eds. Gyldendal. Viborg, Denmark, 1990. 

ochroleuca
Fungi described in 1801
Fungi of Europe
Taxa named by Christiaan Hendrik Persoon